Brooks Steven Brown (born June 20, 1985) is an American former professional baseball pitcher who played in Major League Baseball (MLB) for the Colorado Rockies from 2014 to 2015.

Career

Amateur
Brown was drafted by the Atlanta Braves in the 21st round of the 2003 Major League Baseball Draft out of Portal High School in Portal, Georgia. He did not sign and attended the University of Georgia and played college baseball for the Georgia Bulldogs. In 2005, he played collegiate summer baseball with the Chatham A's of the Cape Cod Baseball League.

Arizona Diamondbacks
He was drafted by the Arizona Diamondbacks in the first round of the 2006 Major League Baseball Draft.

Detroit Tigers
In April 2009, Brown was traded from the Diamondbacks to the Detroit Tigers for James Skelton.

Pittsburgh Pirates
In November 2012 he signed a minor league deal with the Pittsburgh Pirates.

Colorado Rockies
In November 2013, he signed a minor league deal with the Colorado Rockies.

Brown was called up to the majors for the first time on July 6, 2014.

Los Angeles Dodgers
Brown was claimed off waivers by the Dodgers on October 14, 2015, and outrighted to AAA on December 4. He was given a non-roster invitation to spring training. They released him on February 26, 2016, only one week into spring training.

References

External links

Georgia Bulldogs bio

1985 births
Living people
People from Statesboro, Georgia
People from Portal, Georgia
Baseball players from Georgia (U.S. state)
Major League Baseball pitchers
Colorado Rockies players
Georgia Bulldogs baseball players
Chatham Anglers players
Yakima Bears players
Visalia Oaks players
Mobile BayBears players
Phoenix Desert Dogs players
Erie SeaWolves players
Toledo Mud Hens players
Surprise Rafters players
Indianapolis Indians players
Colorado Springs Sky Sox players